Hossam El Badry (born 23 March 1960) is an Egyptian football coach and former player.

Career

President of Pyramids FC
On 28 June 2018, Saudi billionaire Turki Al-Sheikh purchased Beni Suef based club Al Assyouti Sport and renamed the club to Pyramids FC. On the same day, he appointed Hossam Al Badry as the club’s president. Hossam defected from the club after it was taken over by Salem Al Shamsi and went on to coach the Egyptian national team until he was sacked in 2021 due to bad results.

Honours and achievements

Player
Al Ahly
Egyptian Premier League: 1978–97, 1980–81, 1981–82, 1984–85, 1985–86, 1986–87
Egypt Cup: 1980–81, 1982–83, 1983–84, 1984–85
African Cup of Champions Clubs: 1982, 1987
African Cup Winners' Cup: 1984, 1985, 1986

Manager
Al Ahly
Egyptian Premier League: 2009–10, 2016–17, 2017–18
Egypt Cup: 2016–17
Egyptian Super Cup: 2010, 2011, 2017
CAF Champions League: 2012
CAF Super Cup: 2013

Al-Merrikh SC  
Sudan Premier League: 2011

References

Egyptian footballers
Egypt international footballers
Al Ahly SC players
Egyptian football managers
Al Ahly SC managers
Expatriate football managers in Libya
1960 births
Living people
ENPPI SC managers
Al-Merrikh SC managers
Egyptian Premier League players
Association football defenders
Egypt national football team managers